Jayne Louise Ludlow  (born 7 January 1979) is a Welsh football coach and former player who is currently the technical director of Manchester City Girls' Academy. In 2018, she was inducted on to the Welsh Sports Hall of Fame Roll of Honour along with Roy Francis (Rugby League), Lynne Thomas (Cricket / Hockey), Kelly Morgan (Badminton) and Becky James (Cycling).

As a player, Ludlow played as a midfielder for Arsenal for 13 years and captained the Wales national team until her international retirement in 2012. Ludlow also captained Arsenal and was the club's top goalscorer of all time when she retired.

After retiring from playing, Ludlow moved into management and led the Wales national team and its youth teams.

Club career
Ludlow's father had been a professional football player, and she began her own football career early, playing with a boys' team before having to stop aged 12. Ludlow enjoyed a promising junior career in athletics, being the British record holder in the triple jump at Under-17 level and also representing the UK at the Under-20s level. She also represented Wales at netball and basketball. Ludlow decided to focus on football, but had to travel to Barry Town to play since there were no girls' teams in the South Wales Valleys.

Ludlow won a scholarship to University of Pennsylvania in the United States, but left months into the four-year course due to dissatisfaction with the standard of football. She then moved to London and played for Millwall Lionesses and Southampton Saints while completing a physiotherapy degree at King's College, London.

Joining Arsenal in 2000, Ludlow scored 28 goals from midfield as she helped the Gunners to a domestic treble in her first season. At the time, manager Vic Akers described her as "the best box-to-box player in the women's game". She was voted Players' Player of the Year in 2001, an achievement she repeated in 2003 and 2004. In 2007, Ludlow was a key part of the side which won an unprecedented quadruple, scoring 24 goals. In the 2005 off-season she returned to the United States to play for New York Magic.

She stayed loyal to Arsenal to become vice-captain and later captain of the side.

During Arsenal's 1–0 league win at Everton in April 2010, Ludlow was red carded for an "aggressive outburst" at opponent Fara Williams. This meant that club captain Ludlow was suspended for the 2010 FA Women's Cup Final, in which Arsenal were beaten by Everton.

In July 2013 after a succession of injuries, Ludlow announced her retirement from playing, indicating a desire to focus on her role as an academy coach with Arsenal Ladies and Wales. Altogether with Arsenal Ludlow, she won nine league titles, six FA Cups, and a UEFA Women's Cup. Ludlow is Arsenal Ladies highest goal scorer of all time.

International career
Ludlow won her first senior Wales cap at the age of 17, against the Republic of Ireland in February 1996.

In November 2010, she returned to the fold following the appointment of new coach Jarmo Matikainen. Ludlow then won her 50th cap, and scored her 18th goal, in captaining Wales to an 8–1 win over Bulgaria.

When Ludlow retired from international football in October 2012, she was described by Matikainen as "the most successful player that Wales has ever had".

Coaching career
In August 2013, Ludlow accepted a position as manager and director of Reading, who had successfully bid for a place in the FA WSL 2. She stepped down from the role at the end of the 2014 FA WSL season, after being appointed manager of the Wales women's national football team on 2 October 2014.

Playing style
Ludlow sought to mimic Pelé in terms of her playing style at first. She went on to model her game upon players such as Roy Keane to become a more orthodox midfielder.
Ludlow has also often been compared with fellow Gunner Freddie Ljungberg to her delight.

Managerial statistics

Personal life
Ludlow is also a big fan of Arsenal.

Honours
Ludlow was appointed Member of the Order of the British Empire (MBE) in the 2019 Birthday Honours for services to women's football in Wales.

Arsenal
UEFA Women's Cup: (1) 2006–07
FA Women's Premier League National Division: (9) 2000–01, 2001–02, 2003–04, 2004–05, 2005–06, 2006–07, 2007–08, 2008–09, 2009–10
FA WSL: (2) 2011, 2012
FA WSL Cup: (2) 2011, 2012
FA Women's Cup: (6) 2000–01, 2003–04, 2005–06, 2006–07, 2007–08, 2008–09
Women's League Cup: (4) 2000–01, 2004–05, 2006–07, 2008–09

Individual
FA Players' Player of the Year Award: (3) 2000–01, 2002–03, 2003–04

References

External links
 
 

1979 births
Living people
Welsh women's footballers
Women's association football midfielders
Arsenal W.F.C. players
Southampton Saints L.F.C. players
Millwall Lionesses L.F.C. players
People from Llwynypia
Sportspeople from Rhondda Cynon Taf
Wales women's international footballers
FA Women's National League players
Women's Super League players
People educated at Treorchy Comprehensive School
Alumni of King's College London
Female association football managers
Women's national association football team managers
Members of the Order of the British Empire
Welsh football managers
Wales women's national football team managers
Manchester City W.F.C. non-playing staff